The 8th European Women's Artistic Gymnastics Championships were held in Minsk, Soviet Union, in 1971.

Medalists

References 

1971
European Artistic Gymnastics Championships
1971 in European sport
International gymnastics competitions hosted by Belarus
International gymnastics competitions hosted by the Soviet Union
1971 in Soviet sport
1971 in women's gymnastics